DB9 is a super-yacht launched on 13 July 2010 at the Palmer Johnson shipyard in the United Kingdom and delivered the following year. The interior and exterior design of DB9 were created by Nuvolari & Lenard.

DB9 has two sisterships, the first named Bliss. A second sistership named Sanam, built in Florida, was delivered in July 2016.

Design 
Both the materials of the hull and the superstructure are made out of Aluminium with teak laid decks. The yacht is Lloyd's registered, issued by Cayman Islands.

Engines 
The main engines are two MTU 16V 4000 M93L .

See also
 Bliss
 Luxury yacht
 List of motor yachts by length
 List of yachts built by Palmer Johnson

References 

2010 ships
Motor yachts
Ships built in Southampton